Maclay may refer to:

Institutions
 Maclay School, PK–12 private school in Tallahassee, Florida
 Claremont School of Theology, formerly the Maclay School of Theology, Claremont, California
 Maclays Brewery, brewery in Alloa, Scotland

Places
 Alfred B. Maclay Gardens State Park, Tallahassee, Florida

People
 Charles Maclay (1822–1890), California State Senator and Methodist minister
 Charles Maclay (anatomist) (1913–1978), Scottish anatomist and surgeon
 John Maclay, 1st Viscount Muirshiel (1905–1992), Secretary of State for Scotland
 Baron Maclay, peerage. Held by:
 Joseph Paton Maclay, 1st Baron Maclay (1857–1951), Glasgow shipowner and Minister of Shipping (1916–1921)
 Joseph Maclay, 2nd Baron Maclay (1899–1969), Scottish peer and Liberal politician
 Nicholas Miklouho-Maclay (1846–1888), Russian explorer, ethnologist, anthropologist and biologist.
 Robert Samuel Maclay (1824–1907), Methodist Episcopal Church missionary, associated with Fuzhou
 Robert Maclay (merchant) (1834–1898), merchant, executive, banker, School Board member
 Samuel Maclay (1741–1811), Surveyor from Pennsylvania
 William Maclay (politician) (1737–1804), from Pennsylvania
 William Maclay (Representative) (1765–1825), US Representative from Pennsylvania
 William B. Maclay (1812–1882), US Representative from New York
 William Plunkett Maclay (1774–1842), US Representative from Pennsylvania
 William P. Maclay (Medal of Honor) (1877–1943), for heroism during the Philippine–American War

Fictional
 Tara Maclay, from Buffy the Vampire Slayer

Middle name
 Robert Maclay Widney (1838–1929), California judge and a founder of The University of Southern California
 Thaddeus Maclay Mahon (1838–1918), soldier, attorney, railroad executive, and Republican US Representative from Pennsylvania
 William Maclay Awl (1799–1876), alienist, a politician, and mental health hospital administrator from Pennsylvania

See also

 McClay
 McLay (disambiguation)
 Macklay